Motherboards

IOMMU Supported hardware including VMWare info can be found here too

Lists of computer hardware